Emerson Palmieri dos Santos  (born 3 August 1994), known as Emerson Palmieri or simply Emerson, is a professional footballer who plays as a left-back for  club West Ham United and the Italy national team.

Internationally, Emerson played for his native Brazil at under-17 level, but he later declared his desire to represent Italy, having been granted Italian citizenship in 2017. He has since been called up to the Italy national team, making his senior international debut with the side in 2018 and later taking part at UEFA Euro 2020, winning the tournament.

Club career

Santos
Born in Santos, São Paulo, Emerson played in  Santos' youth team making  his first team debut on 17 April 2011, coming on as a late substitute for Keirrison in a 3–0 Campeonato Paulista home win against Paulista. His first start occurred on 21 January 2012, in a 1–1 away draw against XV de Piracicaba. In February, he returned to the youth team, but he was called up to the match against Mogi Mirim in the following month. He also appeared against Ituano and Paulista, as the club was crowned champions of Paulistão for the third consecutive time.

On 17 June, Emerson made his Série A debut, in a 0–1 defeat against Flamengo. He scored his first goal on 5 September 2013, but in a 1–2 loss at Atlético Paranaense.

Palermo (loan)
On 25 August 2014, Emerson was loaned to Serie A's Palermo, with a buyout clause. He made his debut in the competition on 24 September, coming on as a second half substitute for Fabio Daprelà in a 3–3 away draw against Napoli. Emerson played nine league matches for the club, being mainly a backup to another new signing, Achraf Lazaar.

Roma
On 31 August 2015, Emerson joined fellow league team Roma, on loan for one year. A second-choice behind Lucas Digne, he made his debut for the club on 4 October in a 4–2 away win against former side Palermo.

Emerson scored his first goal in the top league of Italian football on 14 May 2016, in a 3–1 away win against Milan; after replacing Stephan El Shaarawy in the 78th minute, he netted his team's third after a rebound. His loan was extended for a further season on 7 July.

On 5 December 2016, after reaching 12 matches during the campaign, Emerson was bought outright for a reported fee of €2 million.

Emerson missed much of the first half of the 2017–18 season due to an anterior cruciate ligament injury that he suffered in May 2017. He made his comeback on 1 December 2017, coming off the bench in the last 15 minutes of the match against SPAL for the Serie A, which turned out as his sole appearance for Roma during that season.

Chelsea

On 30 January 2018, Emerson joined English side Chelsea on a four-and-half-year deal for an undisclosed fee. According to Roma, the transfer fee was €20 million plus €9 million bonus. He made his debut against Hull City in the fifth round of the FA Cup, assisting fellow January signing Olivier Giroud for his first Chelsea goal. The Blues came out 4–0 winners at Stamford Bridge.

Emerson made his Premier League debut on 4 March 2018 as a second-half substitute in a 1–0 defeat at Manchester City. His first Premier League start came away to Burnley on 19 April. Emerson set up Victor Moses for the winning goal as Chelsea claimed a 2–1 victory. Chelsea went on to win the 2017–18 FA Cup but Emerson was injured and missed the final.

On 26 September 2018, in his first appearance of the 2018–19 season, Emerson scored his first goal for Chelsea, the equaliser in an eventual 2–1 away win against Liverpool, in the third round of the EFL Cup. On 24 February 2019, he started for Chelsea in the 2019 EFL Cup Final on, and was one of the three Chelsea players to convert their spot kicks in the resulting shoot-out following a 0–0 draw after extra-time; however, Manchester City ultimately prevailed 4–3. On 29 May, he assisted Olivier Giroud's opening goal in a 4–1 win over Arsenal in the 2019 UEFA Europa League Final. On 17 March 2021, Emerson scored his first UEFA Champions League goal for the Blues in a 2–0 home win over Atlético Madrid in the second leg of the Round of 16 tie. Emerson was part of the Chelsea squad which won the 2021 UEFA Champions League Final 1–0 against Manchester City, however did not come off the bench in the match.

Lyon (loan)
On 19 August 2021, Emerson joined Ligue 1 side Lyon on a one-year loan.

West Ham United
On 23 August 2022, Emerson joined Premier League side West Ham United on a four-year contract with a one-year option for an undisclosed fee from fellow Premier League club Chelsea.

International career
Emerson represented Brazil at under-17 level during the 2011 South American U-17 Championship and during 2011 FIFA U-17 World Cup, being crowned champions of the former. He was an undisputed starter during both tournaments, scoring a goal against Chile on 16 March 2011.

In March 2017, after being close to acquiring Italian citizenship, Emerson was reportedly pursued by Italy head coach Gian Piero Ventura with the intention of switching his international allegiance to Italy. He officially switched allegiance to Italy on 29 March 2017. Emerson was called up by Ventura for matches against Uruguay and Liechtenstein in June 2017, however, withdrew due to injury and replaced by Andrea Conti.

On 19 May 2018, new Italy coach Roberto Mancini called Emerson for Italy's May and June friendly matches against Saudi Arabia, France and the Netherlands, however, he withdrew due to another injury. He was later called up again to the team in September 2018, for Italy's opening UEFA Nations League matches against Poland and Portugal later that month. He made his senior international debut for Italy on 10 September, during the UEFA Nations League match against Portugal, coming on as a second-half substitute for Domenico Criscito in his team's 1–0 away loss.

In June 2021, Emerson was included in Italy's squad for UEFA Euro 2020. On 11 July, Emerson won the European Championship with Italy following a 3–2 penalty shoot-out victory over England at Wembley Stadium in the final, after a 1–1 draw in extra-time; Emerson started the final, and was substituted for Alessandro Florenzi in extra-time.

Style of play
Emerson usually plays as a left-back, and is known for his stamina, athleticism, physical qualities, and technique, which make him an effective offensive asset. He is also known for his ability to get past opponents and provide crosses into the penalty box. A versatile player, he is also capable of playing as a wing-back or wide midfielder on the left flank, and has even been used in a more advanced role as an offensive winger on occasion. Emerson's Chelsea profile notes that he is "skilful, possesses a good range of passing and reads the game well".

Personal life
Emerson has Italian ancestry on his mother's side from Rossano, near Cosenza in Calabria, and has been an Italian citizen since March 2017. His older brother, Giovanni, is also a footballer and a left back.

Career statistics

Club

International

Honours
Santos
 Campeonato Paulista: 2011, 2012

Chelsea
 UEFA Champions League: 2020–21
 UEFA Europa League: 2018–19
 UEFA Super Cup: 2021; runner-up: 2019
 FA Cup runner-up: 2019–20, 2020–21
 EFL Cup runner-up: 2018–19

Brazil U17
 South American U-17 Championship: 2011

Italy
 UEFA European Championship: 2020
UEFA Nations League third place: 2020–21

Orders
 5th Class / Knight: Cavaliere Ordine al Merito della Repubblica Italiana: 2021

References

External links

 Emerson at West Ham United F.C.
 
 
 
 
 
 Profile at the Italian Football Federation 
 Profile at LegaSerieA.it 

1994 births
Living people
Sportspeople from Santos, São Paulo
Brazilian people of Italian descent
Citizens of Italy through descent
Brazilian footballers
Brazil youth international footballers
Italian footballers
Italy international footballers
Association football fullbacks
Santos FC players
Palermo F.C. players
A.S. Roma players
Chelsea F.C. players
Olympique Lyonnais players
West Ham United F.C. players
Campeonato Brasileiro Série A players
Serie A players
Premier League players
Ligue 1 players
UEFA Europa League winning players
UEFA Champions League winning players
UEFA Euro 2020 players
Brazilian expatriate footballers
Brazilian expatriate sportspeople in England
Brazilian expatriate sportspeople in France
Italian expatriate footballers
Italian expatriate sportspeople in England
Italian expatriate sportspeople in France
Expatriate footballers in England
Expatriate footballers in France
UEFA European Championship-winning players
Knights of the Order of Merit of the Italian Republic